In the typology of ancient Greek pottery, the dinos (plural dinoi) is a mixing bowl or cauldron. Dinos means "drinking cup," but in modern typology is used (wrongly) for the same shape as a lebes, that is, a bowl with a spherical body meant to sit on a stand. It has no handles and no feet.

The Dinos Painter, one of the ancient Greek artists known for vase painting, takes his name from the type of vase characteristic of his work.

Dinos were used for mixing water and wine, as it was considered rude to drink straight out of the goblet, at the time.

See also
 Dinos of the Gorgon Painter
 Ancient Greek vase painting
 Pottery of ancient Greece

References

Ancient Greek pot shapes